Crenicichla rosemariae is a species of cichlid native to South America. It is found in the upper Xingu River drainage; Suiá-Missu River, Amazon River basin in Brazil.

The fish is named in honor of Rosemary Lowe-McConnell (1921-2014), who collected the type specimen.

References

Kullander, S.O., 1997. Crenicichla rosemariae, a new species of pike cichlid (Teleostei, Cichlidae) from the upper Rio Xingu drainage, Brazil. Ichthyol. Explor. Freshwat. 7(3-4):279-287. 

rosemariae
Freshwater fish of Brazil
Fish of the Amazon basin
Taxa named by Sven O. Kullander
Fish described in 1997